Ballıca is a village in the Elazığ District of Elazığ Province in Turkey. Its population is 117 (2021). The village is populated by Turkmens.

References

Villages in Elazığ District